F. Dean Toste (born 1971 in Terceira, Azores, Portugal) is the Gerald E. K. Branch Distinguished Professor of Chemistry at the University of California, Berkeley and Faculty Scientist at the Chemical Sciences Division of Lawrence Berkeley National Lab. He is a prominent figure in the field of organic chemistry and is best known for his contributions to gold chemistry and asymmetric ion-pairing catalysis. Toste was elected a member of the National Academy of Sciences in 2020, and a member of the American Academy of Arts and Sciences in 2018.

Education and training 
Toste attended the University of Toronto for his undergraduate and masters studies in the group of Ian Still. With Still, Toste developed several novel reactions of thiocyanates that were then applied towards the synthesis of the natural product Varacin. He earned his B.Sc. in 1993 and his M.Sc. in 1995. Toste attended graduate school at Stanford University, earning his PhD under the supervision of Barry Trost in 2000 While at Stanford, Toste published twenty-four publications on a range of topics, including phenols in palladium-catalyzed reactions, and ruthenium-catalyzed carbon-carbon bond forming reactions. He also completed the enantioselective total syntheses of the natural products (−)-galanthamine, (−)-aflatoxin B1 and (−)-calanolide A and B.

From 2001 to 2002, Toste conducted postdoctoral studies at the California Institute of Technology with Robert H. Grubbs, where he worked on ruthenium-catalyzed cross-metathesis variants of the olefin metathesis reaction.

Independent career 
Toste joined the faculty at Berkeley in 2002 as an assistant professor. He was promoted to Associate Professor in 2006, and Professor in 2009. In 2017, Toste was appointed the Gerald E. K. Branch Distinguished Professor. He has served as a Faculty Scientist at the Chemical Sciences Division of Lawrence Berkeley National Lab since 2007.

Awards and honors 
Toste is the recipient of numerous awards for his work, including the Janssen Prize for Creativity in Organic Synthesis in 2018, the Humboldt Research Award in 2016, the Catalysis in Organic Chemistry Award from the Royal Society of Chemistry in 2018, and the American Chemical Society Cope Scholar and E. J. Corey Awards.

References

External links 
 Toste Group at Berkeley

1971 births
Living people
Canadian chemists
Members of the United States National Academy of Sciences
American chemists
UC Berkeley College of Chemistry faculty